Christopher Sellier (born ) is a Trinidad and Tobago male track cyclist, and part of the national team. He was allowed to start in the team sprint event at the 2009 UCI Track Cycling World Championships, but the team did not start.

He is the son of Olympic track cyclist Anthony Sellier.

References

External links
 Profile at cyclingarchives.com

1986 births
Living people
Trinidad and Tobago track cyclists
Trinidad and Tobago male cyclists
Place of birth missing (living people)
Cyclists at the 2010 Commonwealth Games
Commonwealth Games competitors for Trinidad and Tobago
Competitors at the 2010 Central American and Caribbean Games
21st-century Trinidad and Tobago people